F Hydrae, also known as HD 74395, is a star in the constellation Hydra with an apparent magnitude is 4.64.  It was catalogued as 31 Monocerotis, but this name is now rarely used since the star is now within the boundaries of Hydra.  It is a low mass yellow supergiant around a thousand times brighter than the sun and five times as massive.

F Hya is a catalogued as a triple star, with 8th magnitude BD-06°2707 80" away and 13th magnitude companion at 57".

References

Hydra (constellation)
G-type supergiants
074395
Monocerotis, 31
Triple stars
3459
Hydri, F
042835
Durchmusterung objects